The TI-95, also called the TI-95 Procalc, is a keystroke programmable calculator and was introduced in 1987 by Texas Instruments. It was rather large, measuring 3.7" by 8" by 1" and had a dot-matrix display. It had 8kB of RAM and could be connected to PC-324 compatible printers. Compatible ROM and extra RAM could be placed in the expansion slot at the upper right corner of the device. The compatible ROM were labeled Mathematics, Statistics, and Chemistry, indicating their respective applications.

External links 
 pocket.free.fr 
 datamath.org
 Some more pictures on MycalcDB

Texas Instruments programmable calculators